Jocara raymonda is a species of snout moth in the genus Jocara. It is found in French Guiana.

References

Moths described in 1922
Jocara